The Borstal is a Czech drama film about a teacher newly assigned to youth detention center. It was made by director Hynek Bočan in 1968, but for political reasons it remained unfinished until 1990.

Cast
 Ivan Vyskočil as Teacher
 Václav Sloup as Topol
 Ivan Chocholouš as Štrobach
 Vilém Besser as Director
 Zdeněk Kryzánek as Caretaker Kostelecký
 Jiří Smutný as Caretaker Helebrant
 Vladimír Krška as Caretaker Krofta
 Jiří Krampol as Holub

References

External links
 
 Film on youtube

Czech drama films
Czechoslovak drama films
1960s Czech-language films
Czechoslovak black-and-white films
1968 films
1990 films
Films based on Czech novels
Films set in Prague
Films shot in Prague
1960s Czech films
1960s rediscovered films